Parliamentary elections were held in Czechoslovakia on 27 October 1929. The Republican Party of Farmers and Peasants, emerged as the largest party, winning 46 seats in the Chamber of Deputies and 24 seats in the Senate. Voter turnout was 90.2% in the Chamber election and 78.8% for the Senate. The rightward shift of the 1925 elections was reversed, with moderate centre-left groups (Social Democrats and Czechoslovak National Socialists) increasing their vote shares whilst the Communist Party suffered a set-back.

Background
The 1929 election took place at a time of relative prosperity, just before the Great Depression.

The Communist Party was the sole multinational political party in the country at the time. It had emerged as a major force in the 1925 election and had around 150,000 members in 1928. In 1929 leadership shifted to a younger generation and a major purge of party ranks took place.

The Czechoslovak National Democrats contested the election in Slovakia together with the Slovak National Party led by Martin Rázus. Nevertheless, relations between Rázus and the leader of the National Democrats in Slovakia Milan Ivanka were strained, as the former was fiercely autonomist and the latter a strong supporter of Czechoslovak nationhood.

In Slovakia, Hlinka's Slovak People's Party resigned from the coalition government on 8 October 1929. The move followed a long controversy around the legal case of the party newspaper editor Vojtech Tuka, who was sentenced for espionage and treason on 5 October 1929. The Tuka affair had resulted in an internal rift in the party, with the expelled anti-Tuka faction (led by Juriga and Tománek) setting up their own Juriga's Slovak People's Party.

Results
Hlinka's Slovak People's Party saw a decline compared to the 1925 vote, being reduced from 23 seats to 19. One interpretation is that two years of government participation without achieving Slovak autonomy had weakened the party. Moreover, the party had an ambiguous stance during the Tuka affair. The Juriga faction failed to make any impact in the election.

The Czechoslovak Social Democrats won five seats from Slovakia, an increase by three seats compared to the 1925 election. The Communist Party on the other hand retreated from 5 seats in Slovakia, compared to 8 seats in 1925. Magyar and German parties won 9 seats from Slovakia.

The Czechoslovak National Socialists, which lacked widespread support in the area, managed to win two seat from Slovakia. This was the best result for the party in Slovakia during the years of the First Republic. Another Czech party trying to build a base in Slovakia was the Czechoslovak People's Party, which managed to get its local leader Martin Mičura elected.

The Jewish Party, which had failed to win representation in 1925, managed to win two seats through an alliance with three Polish parties. Its deputies were Ludvík Singer from Bohemia and Julius Reiz from Slovakia.

General Radola Gajda's list ('League against Bound Tickets'), which called for the formation of a corporativist state, failed to make a major headway but won three seats (Gajda, Jiří Stříbrný and Karel Pergler). Gajda's political line was fascist, anti-Semitic and anti-German.

Senate

Chamber of Deputies

By province

By electoral district

Prague

Hradec Králové
Josef Adámek (Czechoslovak People's Party) was elected from Pardubice electoral district.

Mladá Boleslav
Amongst the deputies elected from the Česká Lípa 5th electoral district were Ernst Grünzner (DSAP), Irene Kirpal (DSAP), Josef Schweichhart (DSAP), Josef Kleibl (DNP) and Hans Krebs.

Louny

Plzeň

Brno
Amongst the deputies elected from the Jihlava 10th electoral district were Johann Wagner (German Electoral Coalition), Erwin Zajicek (German Christian Social People's Party) and Viktor Stern (Communist Party).

Moravská Ostrava

Turčiansky Svätý Martin

Liptovský Svätý Mikuláš

Prešov

Nové Zámky
The Nové Zámky senatorial district consisted of the Nové Zámky 16th electoral district and the Kosice 20th electoral district, two districts that together hosted around 96% of the Hungarian and 56% of the German population of Slovakia. The percentage achieved by the Communist Party in the Nové Zámky 16th electoral district was the highest in the country in the 1929 vote.

Hlinka's Slovak People's Party fielded Vojtech Tuka in the Košice 20th electoral district, but he failed to win a seat. Fielding Tuka in a district where the party lacked strong support displayed the ambiguity the party had towards him during his treason trials.

Užhorod
A bloc aligned with the Agrarians merged as the most voted list in the Užhorod electoral district, the sole electoral district in Subcarpathian Rus'. The bloc formed by the National Democrats, which includes the Autonomous Agrarian Union, the Russian National Union and the Carpatho-Russian Labour Party of Small Peasants and Landless, finished in second place.

The Czechoslovak Social Democratic Workers' Party stood on a joint list with the Social Democratic Workers' Party in Subcarpathian Rus' in the constituency. The sole mandate won by this list went to Julius Husnaj of the Czechoslovak Social Democratic Workers' Party.

The Czechoslovak People's Party contested under the name 'Christian People's Party' in the Užhorod electoral district.

Aftermath
On 7 December 1929 František Udržal formed a coalition government of Czechoslovak Agrarians, Czechoslovak People's Party, Czechoslovak Social Democrats, Czechoslovak National Socialists, Czechoslovak National Democrats, Czechoslovak Traders' Party, German Agrarians and German Social Democrats. Whilst the cabinet was politically broadened after the 1929 elections, it lacked representation from Slovak populists, German Clericals or the Magyar parties.

References

Czechoslovakia
Parliamentary election
Legislative elections in Czechoslovakia
October 1929 events